NewCity Residential is a high-rise complex of seven skyscrapers in Tijuana, Baja California, Mexico. In the San Diego–Tijuana, region the buildings are increasingly being referred to as New City. The complex has just begun construction and will consist of seven towers, out of which four have been built. With 27 stories, Diamond Tower is currently the tallest building in Tijuana. The other six towers will be the second-tallest buildings in Tijuana, with 24 stories.

The complex is located within Tijuana's central business district, Zona Río.

Architecture
The project was designed by the local Espazio architectural Group led by Arq. Jorge Gutierrez in association with Estrategias Urbanas consulting represented by Arq. Hector Osuna Jaime. New City was designed with the idea of creating a setting of comfort for the surrounding San Diego-Tijuana populace. It was also designed to appeal to most people and features a modern and unique look.

Design

The buildings are surrounded by a tall concrete wall and maintain gated access.
The towers facade material consists of concrete and the buildings have a curtain wall facade style. The style of building is postmodern and thus contemporary.

Gallery

See also
 List of tallest buildings in Tijuana

References

External links
Tiene Todo

Skyscrapers in Tijuana
Residential skyscrapers in Mexico